Burkey is a given name and surname. Notable people with the name include:

 Burkey Belser (born 1947), American graphic designer
 Jason Burkey (born 1985), American actor
 Nate Burkey (born 1985), Filipino footballer

See also
 Berkey
 Burke